David Owen Brooks (February 12, 1955 – May 28, 2020) was an American convicted murderer and accomplice of serial killer Dean Corll, who, along with Elmer Wayne Henley, abducted, raped, tortured, and murdered at least 28 boys and young men between 1970 and 1973 in Houston, Texas. The crimes, which became known as the Houston Mass Murders, came to light after Henley fatally shot Corll.

Many of the victims had been friends of Brooks and Henley. At the time of their discovery, the Houston Mass Murders were considered the worst example of serial murder in American history.

In the years between his 1975 conviction and his death in 2020 from COVID-19, Brooks was repeatedly denied parole (finally in 2018).

Childhood
Brooks first met Corll while in the sixth grade. He was one of many children and youths who socialized at the Corll Candy Company, and later admitted Corll was one of few people who did not mock his glasses. In Brooks' oral confession, he admitted that Corll sexually abused him from the age of 12, for which Corll paid him with gifts or cash.

Criminal history
Corll's victims were typically lured to a succession of addresses in which he resided between 1970 and 1973 with an offer of a party or a lift. They would then be restrained by either force or deception, and all were killed by either strangulation or shooting with a .22-caliber pistol. Seventeen of these murder victims were buried in a rented boat shed, four were buried in woodland near Lake Sam Rayburn, one was buried on a beach in Jefferson County, and at least six were buried on a beach on the Bolivar Peninsula.

Corll is known to have committed one murder, and likely two, prior to Brooks's participation as accomplice.

In December 1970, Brooks entered unannounced into Corll's apartment at 3300 Yorktown Street. He discovered Corll in the act of sexually assaulting two teenage boys, whom he had strapped to a four-poster bed. According to Brooks, Corll "jumped up and said, 'I'm just having some fun!'" He promised Brooks a car in return for his silence; Brooks accepted this offer and Corll bought him a green Chevrolet Corvette. Brooks was later told by Corll that the two youths had been murdered, and he was offered $200 for any boy he could lure to Corll's apartment—an enticement he accepted.

In the winter of 1971, Brooks, having by this stage assisted in luring a minimum of six teenage boys to Corll's various addresses, introduced an acquaintance of his named Elmer Wayne Henley to Corll. Henley was likely an intended victim, although Corll evidently saw Henley as an invaluable potential accomplice. Both Brooks and Henley would remain active participants in the abduction and abuse of Corll's victims until Corll was shot to death by Henley on August 8, 1973.

In addition to their participating in the abductions and murders of the victims, both Brooks and Henley also burgled several addresses, for which they were paid small sums of money.

Brooks was found guilty in State of Texas v. David Owen Brooks in 1975. He was found guilty of the June 4, 1973 abduction and murder of 15-year-old William Ray Lawrence. An appeal against Brooks' conviction was lodged but in 1979 this appeal was dismissed.

Death
Brooks died on May 28, 2020, at age 65, in a Galveston, Texas, hospital while serving out his life sentence. He had other illnesses, but died from COVID-19.

Media

Film
 A film loosely inspired by the Houston Mass Murders, Freak Out, was released in 2003. The film was directed by Brad Jones, who also starred as Dean Corll. This film largely focuses upon the last night of Dean Corll's life, prior to Henley shooting him and contacting authorities. The film procured mostly mixed to positive reviews, though Jones' performance was acclaimed.
 Production of a film directly based upon the Houston Mass Murders, In a Madman's World, finished in 2014. Directed by Josh Vargas, In a Madman's World is directly based upon Elmer Wayne Henley's life before, during, and immediately after his involvement with Dean Corll and David Brooks. Limited edition copies of the film were released in 2017.

Bibliography
 Christian, Kimberly (2015). Horror in the Heights: The True Story of The Houston Mass Murders. CreateSpace. .
 Gurwell, John K. (1974). Mass Murder in Houston. Cordovan Press.
 Hanna, David (1975). Harvest of Horror: Mass Murder in Houston. Belmont Tower.
 
 Rosewood, Jack (2015). Dean Corll: The True Story of The Houston Mass Murders. CreateSpace .

Television
 A 1982 documentary, The Killing of America, features a section devoted to the Houston Mass Murders.
 FactualTV hosted a documentary focusing upon the murders committed by Corll and his accomplices. Dr. Sharon Derrick is among those interviewed for the documentary.
 The Investigation Discovery channel has broadcast a documentary focusing upon the Houston Mass Murders within their documentary series, Most Evil. This documentary, entitled "Manipulators", was first broadcast in December 2014.

See also

 Capital punishment in Texas
 Crime in Texas
 List of serial killers by country
 List of serial killers by number of victims

References

Cited works and further reading

External links
 2018 news article detailing victims' families ongoing efforts to ensure David Brooks remains incarcerated
 David Brooks' confession.
 David Brooks' confession specific to the case of William Ray Lawrence
 Online offender profile information pertaining to David Owen Brooks, as authorized by the Texas Department of Criminal Justice
The Last Kid on the Block, April 1976 Texas Monthly article with excerpt of Elmer Wayne Henley's confession from James Conaway's book, The Texans

1955 births
1970 murders in the United States
1973 murders in the United States
2020 deaths
20th-century American criminals
American male criminals
American murderers of children
American prisoners sentenced to life imprisonment
American serial killers
Criminals from Texas
Deaths from the COVID-19 pandemic in Texas
Male serial killers
People from Houston
Prisoners sentenced to life imprisonment by Texas
Prisoners who died from COVID-19
Place of death missing
Serial killers who died in prison custody
Violence against men in North America